The New Kuomintang Alliance was a faction of Kuomintang in the Republic of China (Taiwan), active late 20th century. Composed of mainly younger mainlanders, this faction was in favor of intraparty reform. It accused President Lee Teng-hui of autocratic tendencies, and complained that the KMT was too corrupt. 

In August 1993, days before the 14th National Congress of Kuomintang, the New KMT Alliance broke away to form the Chinese New Party. This move was propelled by the resignation of Premier Hau Pei-tsun, whom New KMT Alliance members had viewed to be a counterbalance to Lee's power.

See also
Politics of the Republic of China
Revolutionary Committee of the Chinese Kuomintang

Political organizations based in Taiwan
Kuomintang